National Secondary Route 112, or just Route 112 (or ) is a National Road Route of Costa Rica, located in the Heredia province.

Description
In Heredia province the route covers Heredia canton (Heredia district), San Isidro canton (San Isidro, San José, San Francisco districts), San Pablo canton (San Pablo district).

References

Highways in Costa Rica